Lyusyena Ivanovna Ovchinnikova (10 September 1931 – 8 January 1999) was a Soviet film actress. She appeared in more than 30 films between 1959 and 1993. She is an Merited Artist of the Russian Federation (1973).

Selected filmography
 A Home for Tanya (1959) as Nyurka
 The Girls (1961) as Katya
 Nine Days in One Year (1962) as Nura
 An Easy Life (1964) as Masha
 The Hockey Players (1965) as Nadia Kudrichi
 The Journalist (1967) as Tamara
 Strong with Spirit (1967) as Galya
 Adventures of Mowgli (1967) as Raksha
 Mama Married (1969) as Zinaida
 Big School-Break (1972) as Valya
 A Great Space Voyage (1975) as Fedya's mother
 Twenty Days Without War (1976) as Xenia Sergeevna
 Valentin and Valentina (1985) as Rita

References

External links

1931 births
1999 deaths
People from Zhytomyr Oblast
Soviet film actresses
Russian Academy of Theatre Arts alumni
Russian film actresses
Honored Artists of the RSFSR
20th-century Russian women